Plaza College is a private for-profit college in Forest Hills, New York. It was founded in 1916 and originally located in Long Island City, Queens, before moving to Jackson Heights in 1970, and its current location in 2014. The Jackson Heights facility burned to the ground on April 21, 2014.

The college offers Associate's and Bachelor's degrees as well as certificate programs in 13 fields including accounting , medical billing, and nursing. It is accredited by the Middle States Commission on Higher Education.

References

External links
Official website

Educational institutions established in 1916
Private universities and colleges in New York City
For-profit universities and colleges in the United States
1916 establishments in New York City